Vangueria cinerascens is a species of flowering plant in the family Rubiaceae. It is found from Tanzania to South Tropical Africa. The epithet is a Latin adjective (classical Latin cinerescens, from verb cinerescere, to turn into ashes) meaning ash-coloured, referring to the indumentum on the leaves.

Taxonomy
There are 5 varieties:
V. cinerascens var. cinerascens
V. cinerascens var. inaequalis (Robyns) Lantz
V. cinerascens var. laeta (Robyns) Lantz
V. cinerascens var. laevior (K.Schum.) Lantz
V. cinerascens var. richardsiae (Robyns) Lantz

External links
World Checklist of Rubiaceae

Flora of Tanzania
cinerascens